.cpp is a filename extension that may apply to:

 Files containing C Preprocessor directives
 Files containing C++ code